Events from the year 1628 in Japan.

Incumbents
Monarch: Go-Mizunoo

Births
July 11 - Tokugawa Mitsukuni, daimyō (d. 1701)

 
1620s in Japan
Years of the 17th century in Japan